Adrian Castro (born 4 June 1990) is a Polish wheelchair fencer. He represented Poland at the Summer Paralympics in 2012, 2016 and 2021 and he is a two-time medalist in the men's sabre B event.

At the 2020 Summer Paralympics held in Tokyo, Japan, he won the silver medal in the men's sabre B event. He won the bronze medal in the men's sabre B event at the 2016 Summer Paralympics. In the same event at the 2012 Summer Paralympics he did not advance to the knockout stage of the competition.

In 2017, at the IWAS Wheelchair Fencing World Cup, he won the gold medal in the men's sabre B event. Two years later, he competed to defend his title and this time he won the silver medal in the men's sabre B event.

References

External links 
 

Living people
1990 births
Polish male sabre fencers
Sportspeople from Częstochowa
Wheelchair fencers at the 2012 Summer Paralympics
Wheelchair fencers at the 2016 Summer Paralympics
Wheelchair fencers at the 2020 Summer Paralympics
Medalists at the 2016 Summer Paralympics
Medalists at the 2020 Summer Paralympics
Paralympic silver medalists for Poland
Paralympic bronze medalists for Poland
Paralympic medalists in wheelchair fencing
Paralympic wheelchair fencers of Poland
21st-century Polish people